Kim Ji-Woong (born January 14, 1989) is a South Korean football player.

External links
 

1989 births
Living people
Association football midfielders
South Korean footballers
Jeonbuk Hyundai Motors players
Gyeongnam FC players
Busan IPark players
Goyang Zaicro FC players
K League 1 players
K League 2 players
K3 League players
Kyung Hee University alumni